Joely Kim Richardson (born 9 January 1965) is an English actress. She is known for her roles as Julia McNamara in the FX drama series Nip/Tuck (2003–10) and Katherine Parr in the Showtime series The Tudors (2010). She has also appeared in films such as 101 Dalmatians (1996), Event Horizon (1997), The Patriot (2000), Return to Me (2000), Anonymous (2011), the Hollywood film adaptation of The Girl with the Dragon Tattoo (2011), the remake of Endless Love (2014), the thriller Red Sparrow (2018), and The Turning (2020).

Early life
Joely Kim Richardson was born in Marylebone, London, to the theatrical Redgrave family, the daughter of actress Vanessa Redgrave and director Tony Richardson (1928–1991), and the granddaughter of actors Sir Michael Redgrave (1908–1985) and Rachel Kempson (1910–2003), Lady Redgrave. Actress Natasha Richardson (1963–2009) was her sister and actor Liam Neeson is her brother-in-law.  She is the aunt of Micheál and Daniel Neeson and the niece of actors Lynn Redgrave (1943-2010) and Corin Redgrave (1939–2010) and cousin of actress Jemma Redgrave, who is five days younger than Richardson.

Joely appeared as an extra at the age of three in the 1968 version of The Charge of the Light Brigade, directed by her father. Richardson and her sister Natasha's early education began at the independent St Paul's Girls' School in Hammersmith. At age 14 Richardson moved to boarding school at the independent Harry Hopman Tennis School in Tampa, Florida. In 1983, she graduated from the Thacher School in Ojai, California, then returned to London to study at the Royal Academy of Dramatic Art and graduated in 1985.

Career
Possessing an early ambition to become a professional tennis player, she spent two years at a tennis academy in Florida. Richardson then turned to acting. In 1985, she portrayed, by flashbacks, the younger version of the leading character played by her mother in the film Wetherby. After a leading role in Peter Greenaway's cult success Drowning by Numbers (1988), her first major role in front of a mass audience was as Joanna Farley in a 1989 television episode of Poirot, based on Agatha Christie's detective series. In a 1989 episode of Jim Henson's The Storyteller, she was cast as a princess. She portrayed a teacher on the verge of a nervous breakdown in the 1989 Channel 4 serial Behaving Badly and fictional Finnish Princess Anna (with "a voice like a tuba") in the 1991 screen comedy King Ralph.

A year later she appeared in Shining Through alongside her future brother-in-law, Liam Neeson, with both actors playing Nazis.

In 1993, Richardson appeared in the BBC's Lady Chatterley opposite Sean Bean. In 1996, she played fashion designer Anita Campbell-Green in the Disney live-action remake of the animated 101 Dalmatians opposite Glenn Close as Cruella de Vil. In 1998, in the television drama The Echo, she played Amanda Powell. The next year, she played in the science fiction horror film Event Horizon as Lieutenant Starck, executive officer of the research and rescue ship Lewis and Clark, sent to rescue crew of the long-lost experimental ship Event Horizon.

One year later, Richardson appeared opposite Mel Gibson in the film The Patriot, an American film set in the American Revolution. Also in 2000, she appeared opposite Hugh Laurie in Maybe Baby, Ben Elton's film adaptation of his book Inconceivable. She was cast in the 2001 film The Affair of the Necklace after director Charles Shyer noticed her resemblance to doomed 18th century French Queen Marie Antoinette.

In 2003, Richardson took on the role of Julia McNamara in the television drama Nip/Tuck, based on the lives of two plastic surgeons in Miami. Her mother, Vanessa Redgrave, appeared in several episodes, playing her character's mother.

In 2005, Richardson starred in Lies My Mother Told Me, based on a true story about a murderous con artist. In 2007, she played the mother in The Last Mimzy with Timothy Hutton and Chris O'Neil. She also starred in the television drama Wallis & Edward, playing the lead role of Wallis Simpson, lover of Edward, Prince of Wales.

In 2009–10, Richardson appeared as Catherine Parr, sixth wife of Henry VIII, in the fourth (and final) season of Showtime's hit period drama The Tudors. The role reunited her with her former husband Tim Bevan, who was part of the show's production team.

Joely joined the cast of TV series Titanic: Blood and Steel in which she played the role of Countess Markievicz. In 2015 she co-starred alongside Arnold Schwarzenegger in the zombie thriller film Maggie.

Charity
Richardson is an Ambassador for The Children's Trust, the UK's leading charity for children with brain injury and neurodisability,  as well as Save the Children.

Personal life
Richardson had an affair with theatre producer Archie Stirling, who was then married to actress Diana Rigg. Richardson married film producer Tim Bevan in 1992; they divorced in 2001. The couple has a daughter, actress Daisy Bevan, born in 1992.

Filmography

Film

Television

Awards and nominations

Notes

References

External links
 

Living people
1965 births
English film actresses
English stage actresses
English television actresses
People from Marylebone
20th-century English actresses
21st-century English actresses
Actresses from London
Alumni of RADA
The Thacher School alumni
Redgrave family
Theatre World Award winners
English expatriates in the United States